The 2017 Temple Owls football team represented Temple University in the 2017 NCAA Division I FBS football season. The Owls were led by first-year head coach Geoff Collins and played their home games at Lincoln Financial Field. They were members of the East Division of the American Athletic Conference. They finished the season 7–6, 4–4 in AAC play to finish in third place in the East Division. They were invited to the Gasparilla Bowl where they defeated FIU.

Schedule

Personnel

Coaching staff

Roster

2017 recruiting class

Game summaries

Notre Dame

Villanova

UMass

South Florida

Houston

East Carolina

UConn

Army

Navy

Cincinnati

UCF

Tulsa

FIU–Gasparilla Bowl

Awards and honors

American Athletic Conference All-Conference Team

First Team
Delvon Randall, S

Second Team
Brian Carter, OL
Sharif Finch, DL
Jacob Martin, DL

Honorable Mention
Sean Chandler, S

NFL Players

NFL Draft Combine

One Temple player was invited to participate in the 2018 NFL Scouting Combine.

† Top performer

2018 NFL Draft

Following the season, the following members of the Temple football team were selected in the 2018 NFL Draft.

In addition to the draft selections above, the following Temple players signed NFL contracts after the draft.

References

Temple
Temple Owls football seasons
Gasparilla Bowl champion seasons
Temple Owls football